Eva Love Vivalt is a Canadian economist. She is currently an Assistant Professor of Economics at the University of Toronto and the founder of AidGrade, a research institute that generates and synthesizes evidence in international development.

Education
Vivalt received a Ph.D. in Economics and an M.A. in Mathematics from the University of California, Berkeley, and an M.Phil. in Development Studies at the University of Oxford. Before joining the University of Toronto, she held positions at Australian National University, Stanford University, New York University, and the World Bank.

Academic career
Vivalt's main research interests are the study of obstacles to evidence-based policy decisions. She also has interests in developmental economics, behavioral economics and effective altruism, and is a principal investigator on Y Combinator Research’s basic income study.

Vivalt is known for her work on the external validity of impact evaluations. She found that most development interventions cannot be distinguished from one another in terms of the impacts that they have on a particular outcome and that effect sizes greatly vary within a particular intervention-outcome combination. Her work in this area has been cited by Angus Deaton and other leading economists and has entered the public discourse. She is also considered an expert on evidence aggregation and the use of Bayesian hierarchical models and is known for her work on metascience. She is currently an Assistant Professor of Economics at the University of Toronto.

Other activity
In 2019, together with Stefano DellaVigna and Devin Pope, Vivalt launched Social Science Prediction Platform, a tool that enables researchers to forecast the results of ongoing studies in the social sciences. Her research on impact evaluation has been covered by The Washington Post, Vox, The Atlantic, and other publications.

Vivalt is a member of Giving What We Can, a community of people who have pledged to donate 10% of their income to the world's most effective charitable organisations.

Personal life
Vivalt married American economist Gabriel Carroll in August 2019.

References

External links
 Official website

Living people
Alumni of the University of Oxford
Academic staff of the Australian National University
Canadian economists
People from Toronto
UC Berkeley College of Letters and Science alumni
Year of birth missing (living people)